79–'85 is the first greatest hits album by New Zealand new wave band Mi-Sex, released in October 1985. The album included tracks from the band's four studio albums and some previously released non-album singles. A limited released of 5000 copies included a bonus 12" medley.

79–'85 peaked at number 46 on the Australian Kent Music Report.

Track listing
Vinyl / Cassette (CBS – SBP 8117)

Limited Edition Bonus 12"

Charts

References

Mi-Sex albums
CBS Records albums
1985 greatest hits albums